Ludowe Zespoły Sportowe (LZS) (Polish, in English Popular Sports Teams) is a union of Polish sport clubs., mainly from villages and small towns

The union was established in 1946, with the first sport club LZS Czarnowąsy in Opole Voivodeship. It was first a subset of the Inspectorate of Physical Education and Sport under the "Samopomoc Chłopska" (Peasant Mutual Aid) organizations in the villages and small towns. However, structures were established at the province or Voivodeship levels by 1950, due to LZS's popularity.

The goals of LZS activity are to lead in the range of physical education and sport. It organizes and popularizes sports for villages in the area and improves the social and cultural aspects to its members, who program the main directions for the Main Council of LZS.

Best known clubs in this union are Igloopol Dębica (formerly in Polish First Division in football) and Kmita Zabierzów.

The LZS is member of the International Sport and Culture Association.

References

External links
LZS's official site  

Sports organisations of Poland